The 42nd Filmfare Awards South Ceremony honouring the winners of the best of South Indian cinema in 1994 is an event held on 23 September 1995 was an event held at the Kamaraj Hall, Madras.

Jury

Awards

Main awards

Kannada cinema

Malayalam cinema

Tamil cinema

Telugu cinema

Lifetime Achievement Awards

Awards Presentation

 M M Ramachandran (Best Film Malayalam) Received Award from Kasturi
 Mullapalli Brahmanandan (Best Film Telugu) Received Award from Edida Nageswara Rao
 Khushbu Receives Bharathi Raja Award (Best Film Tamil) from Sonali Bendre
 Rajendra Singh Babu (Best Director Kannada) Received Award from P V Sarvanan
 Hariharan (Best Director Malayalam) Received Award from Parthiban
 S.V. Krishna Reddy (Best Director Telugu) Received Award from R. B. Choudary
 Shankar (Best Director Tamil) Received Award from Nagma
 Hamsalekha (Best Music Director Kannada) Received Award from Vineeth
 Bombay Ravi (Best Music Director Malayalam) Received Award from Neelam
 A. R. Rahman (Best Music Director Tamil) Received Award from Urmila Matondkar
 Shruthi (Best Actress Kannada) Received Award from Priya Raman
 Shobhana (Best Actress Malayalam) Received Award from Prabhu Deva
 Aamani (Best Actress Telugu) Received Award from Sivakumar and Tisca Chopra
 Revathy (Best Actress Tamil) Received Award from Shilpa Shetty
 Vishnuvardhan (Best Actor Kannada) Received Award from Urvashi
 Mohanlal (Best Actor Malayalam) Received Award from Mammootty
 Rajshekar (Best Actor Telugu) Received Award from Khushbu
 R. Sarathkumar (Best Actor Tamil) Received Award from Manisha Koirala
 K. Balachander (Lifetime Achievement Award) Received Award from Kamal Haasan
 B. Saroja Devi (Lifetime Achievement Award) Received Award from Gemini Ganesan
 K. Viswanath (Lifetime Achievement Award) Received Award from Mani Ratnam
 Hrishikesh Mukherjee (Lifetime Achievement Award) Received Award from Shekhar Kapoor
 Soumitra Chatterjee (Lifetime Achievement Award) Received Award from Nana Patekar
 Madhu (Lifetime Achievement Award) Received Award from Suhasini

References

 Filmfare Magazine November 1995

External links
 
 

Filmfare Awards South